Manley Hot Springs (Too Naaleł Denh  in Koyukon) is a census-designated place (CDP) in Yukon-Koyukuk Census Area, Alaska,  United States. At the 2020 census the population was 169, up from 89 in 2010.

Geography
Manley Hot Springs is located at  (65.007773, -150.626732).

The CDP has a total area of  according to the United States Census Bureau. All of it is land.

History
Traditional lands of the Cosna Band of the Upper Koyukon Dene. 

In 1902 a prospector, John Karshner, discovered several hot springs in the area. He began a homestead and vegetable farm. In the same year, the United States Army built a telegraph station. The area became a service and supply point for miners in the Tofty and Eureka mining districts. It was known as Baker's Hot Springs, after nearby Baker Creek.

Farming and livestock operations in the area produced fresh meat, poultry, and produce for sale. In 1903, Sam's Rooms and Meals, now called the Manley Roadhouse, opened.  The Manley Roadhouse was owned by Robert E. Lee, who was also the town's postmaster until his death in 2010.  In 1907 a miner named Frank Manley built the Hot Springs Resort Hotel. The resort was a four-story building with 45 guest rooms, steam heat, electric lights, hot baths, a bar, a restaurant, a billiard room, a bowling alley, a barber shop, and an Olympic-size indoor swimming pool which used heated water from the hot springs. During the summer, the hotel's private boat transported guests from steamers on the Tanana River. In the winter, an overland stagecoach trip from Fairbanks took two days. The town was renamed Hot Springs.

The resort and the mining in the area caused the town to prosper. It had a store, a newspaper, a bakery, clothing stores and other businesses. The population of the area in 1910 was more than 500. In 1913 the resort burned to the ground. Mining activity was also in decline and by 1920 only 29 residents lived in Hot Springs.

The town's name was changed to Manley Hot Springs in 1957.

In May 1984, a newcomer to the town, Michael Silka, killed nine people in the area.

Since 1950, the population of Manley Hot Springs has slowly increased. In the 2020 census, the population of Manley Hot Springs was 169, up 90 percent from 89 in 2010 census.

In May 2022, the second worst flood to hit the community caused power outages and the displacement of 60 people. No injuries occurred. The flooding was caused by an ice jam on the Tanana River, approximately 12 miles downriver from the community.

Climate
Manley Hot Springs has a continental subarctic climate (Köppen Dfc).

Demographics

Manley Hot Springs first reported on the 1910 U.S. Census as "Hot Springs", an unincorporated village. It was formally changed to Manley Hot Springs in 1957. It became a census-designated place (CDP) in 1980.

At the 2000 census, there were 72 people, 36 households and 19 families residing in the CDP. The racial make-up of the CDP was 73.61% White, 23.61% Native American and 2.78% from other races.

There were 36 households, of which 19.4% had children under the age of 18 living with them, 47.2% were married couples living together, 5.6% had a female householder with no husband present and 47.2% were non-families. 38.9% of all households were made up of individuals, and 2.8% had someone living alone who was 65 years of age or older. The average household size was 2.00 and the average family size was 2.58.

15.3% of the population were under the age of 18, 4.2% from 18 to 24, 30.6% from 25 to 44, 37.5% from 45 to 64, and 12.5% were 65 years of age or older. The median age was 44 years. For every 100 females, there were 125.0 males. For every 100 females age 18 and over, there were 110.3 males.

The median household income was $29,000 and the median family income was $59,583. Males had a median income of $36,250 and females $16,250. The per capita income was $21,751. There were no families and 9.7% of the population living below the poverty line, including no under eighteens and none of those over 64.

Education
The Yukon–Koyukuk School District operates the Gladys Dart School in Manley Hot Springs.

Transportation

The Elliott Highway (Alaska Route 2), completed in 1959, gives Manley Hot Springs road access from Fairbanks year-round. Before 1982 it was not plowed by the state and closed during the winter.

The Manley Hot Springs Airport has scheduled flights to Fairbanks International Airport operated by Warbelow's Air Ventures.

References

External links

Census-designated places in Alaska
Census-designated places in Unorganized Borough, Alaska
Census-designated places in Yukon–Koyukuk Census Area, Alaska
Hot springs of Alaska
Bodies of water of Yukon–Koyukuk Census Area, Alaska
Populated places established in the 1900s